Miria Rukoza Koburunga Matembe, LL.D (honoris causa) (born 28 August 1953) is a former member of the Pan-African Parliament from Uganda. While serving there, she was chairperson of the Committee on Rules, Privileges and Discipline a permanent committee of the parliament.

In June 2006, she became a Reagan-Fascell Democracy Fellow with the National Endowment for Democracy.

Matembe is currently the chairperson Citizen coalition on electoral democracy in Uganda (CCEDU).

Background 
Matembe was born in Bwizi Bwera, Kashari, in Mbarara, to Samuel and Eseza Rukooza who were peasants. Matembe is the 4th born of the nine siblings, five boys and four girls.

Education 
Matembe went to Rutooma Primary School, from where she joined Bweranyangi Girls for her O-Level. She went to Namasagali College for her A-Level.
She received her Bachelor of Laws (LLB) degree from Makerere University and her Master of Laws (LLM) degree from the University of Warwick.

Career 
Matembe started her career as a pupil state attorney in the Department of DPP ministry of Justice. She then moved to lecture at Makerere University Business School(MUBS) which was then Uganda College of Commerce. After 5 years she moved to the Central Bank of Uganda(Bank of Uganda).

She was Mbarara District Woman Member of Parliament from 2001 to 2006. She was defeated by NRM’s Peggy Waako in the 2021 Elderly MP elections where she was seeking to represent older persons in the 11th Parliament.

Women's rights advocacy 

Miria Matembe has been a strong proponent for and an advocate of women's rights in Uganda. For over two decades beginning in 1989, she was a member of Uganda’s parliament. She worked in the Ugandan government as minister for ethics and integrity from 1998 to 2003, after which time she became a member of the Pan-African Parliament representing Uganda.

In 1995, she was a member of the Constitutional Commission that created the Ugandan Constitution and She was one of the experts from Uganda and Kenya that reviewed and made proposals on the Proposed Constitution of Tanzania and presented their findings to the Warioba Committee in 2015, under the auspices of Kituo cha Katiba. She was the former chairperson of Action for Development, Uganda's leading women's advocacy organization, an organization she co-founded.

In 1990, she was the deputy general of the Pan-African Congress held in Kampala. She has been a lecturer on law and English at the Chartered Institute of Bankers, also in Kampala. A lawyer by profession, Matembe is also the author of several articles and a book, Miria Matembe: Gender, Politics, and Constitution Making in Uganda, on women in politics.

In October 2006, Matembe gave a lecture entitled "Women, War, Peace: Politics in Peacebuilding" at the University of San Diego's Joan B. Kroc Institute for Peace & Justice Distinguished Lecture Series.

In 2011, she delivered the keynote address at The 11th Sarah Ntiro Lecture and Award held at Grand Imperial Hotel, Kampala -Uganda to those women who are either inspiring models or have worked to facilitate girl-child education at the Forum for African Women Educationalists (Fawe) organised-event and, for the disadvantaged girl-child. The main awards came in two categories; the "Woman of Distinction" award that recognised women whose activities promoted girl child education, and the Model of Excellence award that awarded women achievers who set a good example for young girls.

Matembe who was one of those honoured for her valiant efforts to promote girl child education gave thanks to god when accepting the award. She said ignorance and lack of resources were some of the issues hampering the advancement of girl child education.

Books published 

 The Struggle for Freedom and Democracy Betrayed.
 Woman in the eyes of God : reclaiming a lost identity.
 Miria Matembe: Gender Politics and Constitution Making in Uganda

Awards
 Honorary Doctor of Laws (LL.D) from University of Victoria, 2007

Family 
She is married to Nekemia Matembe and they have 4 sons, named Godwin, Gilbert, Gideon, and Grace.

References

External links

Endowment for Democracy Miria Matembe bio
African Unification Front AUF
 Lecture transcript and video of Matembe's speech at the Joan B. Kroc Institute for Peace & Justice at the University of San Diego, October 2006

Living people
1953 births
Members of the Pan-African Parliament from Uganda
Members of the Parliament of Uganda
Government ministers of Uganda
20th-century Ugandan lawyers
Reagan-Fascell Democracy Fellows
Ugandan women lawyers
20th-century Ugandan women politicians
20th-century Ugandan politicians
21st-century Ugandan women politicians
21st-century Ugandan politicians
Women government ministers of Uganda
Women members of the Parliament of Uganda
Women members of the Pan-African Parliament
People educated at Bweranyangi Girls' Senior Secondary School